Chiliotrichum  diffusum is a species of small shrub, a flowering plant in the family Asteraceae, commonly known as fachine, fascine or mata verde in Spanish. It is native to the southern tip of South America and the Falkland Islands.

Description
It resembles a rosemary bush with aromatic greyish-green foliage. The leaves are elliptical or lanceolate, dark green above and hairy beneath.

Distribution and habitat

In the Falklands Islands, at one time it was common but since the arrival of livestock on the islands, it now mainly occurs in valley bottoms, ravines and other inaccessible places. In southern Chile and Argentina it is the dominant plant on the fringes of the Nothofagus forest.

Ecology
Chiliotrichum  diffusum is native to steppe grassland in Chile, Argentina and the Falkland Islands, where it is one of the dominant shrubby plants in a community that includes Trevoa, Schinus polygama, Paleaepappus patagonicus, Berberis microphylla, various grasses and sedges.

References

Astereae